An airlock, air-lock or air lock, often abbreviated to just lock, is a compartment with doors which can be sealed against pressure which permits the passage of people and objects between environments of differing pressure or atmospheric composition while minimizing the change of pressure in the adjoining spaces and mixing of environments.  The lock consists of a relatively small chamber with two airtight doors in series which do not open simultaneously.

An airlock may be used for passage between environments of different gases or different pressures, or both, to minimize pressure loss or prevent the gases from mixing.

An airlock may also be used underwater to allow passage between an air environment in a pressure vessel and the water environment outside, in which case the airlock can contain air or water. This is called a floodable airlock or an underwater airlock, and is used to prevent water from entering a submersible vessel or an underwater habitat.

Air-locks are used in space flight, saturation diving accommodation, hyperbaric chambers, submarines, some underwater habitats, cleanrooms,  and pressurised caissons and tunnels. Depending on the pressure difference, when people use an airlock to transfer from higher to lower pressure, it may be necessary to follow a decompression schedule to avoid decompression sickness.  A similar arrangement may be used for access to airtight clean spaces, contaminated spaces, or unbreathable atmospheres without necessarily having a pressure difference. In these cases a decontamination procedure and flushing takes the place of pressure changes.

The procedure of entering an air-lock, sealing it, equalising the pressure, and passing through the inner door, is known as locking in. Locking out is to unseal the outer door after equalising pressure and exit the lock compartment to the ambient environment. Locking on and off refer to transfer under pressure where the two chambers are physically connected or disconnected prior to equalizing the pressure and locking in or out.

Operation
Before opening either door, the air pressure of the airlock—the space between the doors—is equalized with that of the environment beyond the next door to open. This is analogous to a waterway lock: a section of waterway with two watertight gates, in which the water level is varied to match the water level on either side.

A gradual pressure transition minimizes air temperature fluctuations (see Boyle's law), which helps reduce fogging and condensation, decreases stresses on air seals, and allows safe verification of pressure suit and space suit operation.

Where a person who is not in a pressure suit moves between environments of greatly different pressures, an airlock changes the pressure slowly to help with internal air cavity equalization and to prevent decompression sickness. This is critical in underwater diving, and a diver or compressed air worker may have to wait in an airlock for some hours, in accordance with an appropriate decompression schedule.

Applications

Airlocks are used in

 spacecraft and space stations, to maintain the habitable environment when persons are exiting or entering the craft.
 hyperbaric chambers, to allow entry and exit while maintaining the pressure difference with the surroundings.
 submarines, diving chambers, and underwater habitats to permit divers to exit and enter.
 torpedo tubes and escape trunks in submarines are airlocks.
 cleanrooms, protected environments in which dust, dirt particles, harmful chemicals, and other contaminants are excluded partially by maintaining the room at a higher pressure than the surroundings.
 hazardous environments, such as nuclear reactors and some biochemical laboratories, in which dust, particles, and/or biological agents are prevented from leaking out by maintaining the room at a lower pressure than the surroundings.
 pressurized domes such as the USF Sun Dome where pressure loss would cause collapse of the structure.
 electron microscopes, where the interior is near vacuum so air does not affect the electron path.

Underwater diving

Locks are used for access to hyperbaric chambers and accommodation in saturation diving, where the saturation spread is commonly pressurized for several weeks, and divers and occasionally support personnel must be transferred between the accommodation chambers and the closed diving bell which is used to transport the divers to the underwater workplace and back. A saturation spread will normally include a stores lock and a medical lock, facilities to lock on a closed bell, and a personnel airlock to compress and decompress people. In a "split-level" spread, where divers may live at two different storage pressures, more airlocks may be needed to effectively service both sections. To decompress the current crew from saturation, one or more of the main accommodation chambers will normally be used as the decompression may take more than a week. Transfer to a hyperbaric escape chamber or lifeboat would also go through a lock, but there will generally be no significant pressure change.

Hyperbaric treatment chambers

In any hyperbaric treatment chamber capable of accommodating more than one person, and where it may be necessary to get a person or equipment into or out of the chamber while it is pressurised, an airlock is used. There will usually be a large airlock at the chamber entry capable of holding one or more persons, and a smaller medical lock for locking in medical supplies and food, and locking out waste.

Compressed air work
Civil engineering projects using air pressure to keep water out of the workplace use an airlock to transfer personnel equipment and materials between the pressurised workplace in a caisson or sealed tunnel and the external normobaric environment. The airlock may need to be large enough to accommodate the whole working shift at the same time. Locking in is usually a quick procedure, taking only a few minutes, while the decompression required for locking out may take hours.

Space flight
An air-lock is used to decompress astronauts after suiting up in space suits, in preparation for extravehicular activity, and to recompress them on return to the habitable spaces.

Similar mechanisms
 In cold climates, two doors arranged in an airlock configuration are common in building entrances.  While not airtight, the double doors minimize the loss of heated air from the building. A similar arrangement is common in hot climates, where it is used to keep interior spaces cool. Revolving doors may be used for the same purpose.
 Some jewelry stores and banks have airlock-like security doors to slow the escape of thieves.
 Butterfly farms and aviaries usually have an airlock-like entrance to prevent the exit of inhabitants and entrance of predatory species.
 Planetariums and photographic dark rooms may have "light-locks" to minimize outside light, protecting occupants' sensitive dark adaptation and preventing light from fogging light sensitive photographic film or paper. These pairs of doors also reduce outside sound.
 Parachute airlocks, where airfoil collapse due to depressurization can result in dangerous loss of altitude.
 Fermentation vessels, where a fermentation lock allows fermentation gases to escape while keeping air out, such as in breweries or wine-makers.

See also
 Fermentation lock
 Revolving door
 Sally port
 Suitport

References

External links
 

Civil engineering
Cleanroom technology
Diving support equipment
Medical equipment
Spacecraft components
Types of gates